The Smurfit Kappa Group plc is Europe's leading corrugated packaging company and one of the leading paper-based packaging companies in the world. It is listed on the London Stock Exchange and is a constituent of the FTSE 100 Index.

History
The company was established as a box-maker in Rathmines, Dublin, Ireland in 1934 and was acquired by Mr Jefferson Smurfit in 1938, trading afterwards as Jefferson Smurfit. It was listed on the Irish Stock Exchange in 1964 and acquired a partial interest in Time Industries, a Chicago-based paper and packaging company, in 1974. Jefferson Smurfit grew under the leadership of the founder's son, Sir Michael Smurfit, who became Chief Executive in 1977.

It merged its 46%-owned US business with Chicago-based Stone Container Corporation to form Smurfit-Stone Container Corporation in 1998.

Jefferson Smurfit was the subject of a management buyout financed by Madison Dearborn Partners, Cinven Limited and CVC Capital Partners in 2002. It merged with Kappa Packaging in 2005, changing its name to Smurfit Kappa, and was the subject of an initial public offering in 2007.

In 2012 it bought Orange County Container, a US-based packaging company, for $340 million. In 2016 it acquired two Brazilian Companies for €186 million.

Operations
The company specialises in manufacturing paper-based packaging, with a network of paper, recycling and forestry operations. It is an integrated producer, with packaging plants sourcing the major part of their raw material requirements from the company's own paper mills. In turn, the sourcing of recovered fibre and wood for the mills is managed through a combination of reclamation and forestry operations and purchases from third parties. It operates across 35 countries - 22 in Europe, 13 in the Americas. Its global headquarters are in Dublin, with regional headquarters in Amsterdam and Miami.

References

External links 
Smurfit Kappa Group Official Site

Multinational companies headquartered in the Republic of Ireland
Pulp and paper companies of the Republic of Ireland
Packaging companies of Ireland
Manufacturing companies established in 1934
2007 initial public offerings
Irish brands
1934 establishments in Ireland
Recycling organizations
Companies listed on Euronext Dublin
Companies listed on the London Stock Exchange